Bian or BIAN may refer to:

Places
 Bian River in China
 Bian, the Chinese abbreviation for Kaifeng, Henan Province, China
 Bian, a former district of the Duchy of Lu in ancient China
 Bian River in Indonesia
 Bian, a former name for Uiseong County, North Gyeongsang, South Korea
 Bian, Hamadan, a village in Iran

People
 Bian, a Chinese surname
 Bian, short for rezubian, the Japanese term for lesbians

Others
 Banking Industry Architecture Network e.V. (BIAN), a nonprofit banking organization
 Bian, a Chinese weapon also known as a "hard whip"
 Bi'an, a Chinese monster considered a tigerlike dragon

See also
 Bian lian in Chinese drama